Shim Young-sung (Hangul: 심영성; born 15 January 1987) is a retired South Korean footballer. He was the top scorer at the AFC Youth Championship 2006. He played at the 2007 FIFA U-20 World Cup.

Club career statistics

References

External links
 
 

1987 births
Living people
South Korean footballers
Association football forwards
South Korea under-20 international footballers
South Korea under-23 international footballers
Seongnam FC players
Jeju United FC players
Gangwon FC players
Seoul E-Land FC players
Busan Transportation Corporation FC players
K League 1 players
K League 2 players
Korea National League players
Sportspeople from Jeju Province